Vincenzo Colosimo (born 11 November 1966) is an Australian AFI Award winning stage, television and screen actor. He has worked in both Australia and the United States. He is of Italian descent and lives in Melbourne, Australia. He was previously married to Australian actress Jane Hall.

Early life
Colosimo was born in Melbourne, one of four children of Italian-born parents from Calabria. He grew up in the inner city suburb of Carlton North.

Career

Film
Colosimo has had some success on film, mainly in Australia. He made his film debut in the coming-of-age story Moving Out in 1983 and featured in 1984's Street Hero.

Other credits include the cult movie Chopper (2000), in which he played Melbourne drug dealer Neville Bartos opposite Eric Bana; The Wog Boy (2000); Lantana (2001); Walking on Water (2002); The Nugget (2002); Take Away (2004); and Opal Dream (2006). In 2008, he starred alongside Leonardo DiCaprio in the 2008 American film Body of Lies. In 2010, Colosimo starred in the sequel Wog Boy 2: Kings of Mykonos. Colosimo also appeared in the vampire film Daybreakers, starring alongside Sam Neill, Willem Dafoe and Ethan Hawke.

In 2011 he starred in the film Face to Face, and in 2012 he starred in Starz "Spartacus" Season 4, portraying a pirate leader.

In 2013 he appeared as a coffee shop owner in The Great Gatsby alongside Leonardo DiCaprio.

Television
Despite several movie roles and guest roles in A Country Practice (1994), Good Guys Bad Guys (1997) and Stingers (2002), it was not until his performance as Joe Sabatini in Something in the Air in 2001 and 2002 that resulted in wider exposure. In 2003, he starred in the telemovie, After the Deluge. In 2003 and 2004, he played Dr. Rex Mariani in The Secret Life of Us. Vince also starred as himself in episode 6 of the hit ABC series We Can Be Heroes. He was chosen to play Phil Olivetti in the fictional mini-series within the show.

From 2005 until late 2007, Colosimo had guest roles in Blue Heelers (2005), MDA (2005), Two Twisted (2006) and City Homicide (2007). His American credits include popular shows such as The Practice (2004) and Without a Trace (2003).

2008 was a busy year for Colosimo. He portrayed Melbourne gangland figure Alphonse Gangitano in the Channel 9 series Underbelly (in a guest role); Channel Ten's telemovie Emerald Falls and Channel Nine's Scorched. He also appeared in Top Gear Australia'''s "Star in a bog-standard car" section in the first episode.

In early 2009, Colosimo appeared in Carla Cametti PD, a six-part series that aired on SBS. In 2010, he had the leading male role in the tele-movie, Wicked Love: The Maria Korp Story about the Maria Korp case.

In 2012 he and his ancestors featured in the SBS show, Who Do You Think You Are?He reprising his role of Alphonse Gangitano in the Underbelly sequel/spin-off series Fat Tony & Co. in 2013, featuring in one episode. 

In May 2022, Colosimo  appeared as a contestant on the sixth season of The Celebrity Apprentice Australia.

Other endeavours
Colosimo was part-owner of a cafe in Northcote, Espresso Alley, with Vince Mazzone.

He also sampled his voice on Snitch by Vanessa Amorosi in on her 2009 album Hazardous (album)

Personal life
He has a daughter, Lucia (born 2002), with his former wife, actress Jane Hall. Colosimo and Hall worked together on A Country Practice in 1994. He lived in Westgarth, a suburb of Melbourne, until late 2015. The mother of his second child is Australian actress Diana Glenn with whom he had a son, Massimo, in April 2014. The couple separated two months after the birth of Massimo. From 2018 his partner has been Sabella Sugar, a producer with Ultrafilms.

Other
He was selected as one of the entrants to the Who's Who in Australia 2011 edition.

In September 2016, Colosimo was charged by police after he was found in possession of Methamphetamine in Melbourne's north. In January 2017, he appeared in court where he had pleaded guilty and was fined $1000 without conviction and was put under a good behaviour bond for a year. Again in April 2021 he was arrested for driving while under the influence of the same drug, facing court and a jail threat.

Credits
Film

Television
{| class="wikitable sortable"
|-
! Year !! Title !! Role !! Notes
|-
| 1994
| A Country Practice| Sergeant Danny Sabatini
| 4 episodes
|-
| 1997
| Good Guys, Bad Guys| Zoran
| Episode: Gone to the Dogs
|-
| 1999
| Halifax f.p.| Detective Johnson
| Episode: Someone You Know
|-
| 2000
| Stingers| Paul Braun
| 3 episodes
|-
| 2001–2002
| Something in the Air| Joe Sabatini
| 29 episodes
|-
| 2003
| Kath & Kim| Jared
| Episode: Obsession
|-
| 2003
| Without a Trace| Gus Finn
| Episode: Trip Box
|-
| 2004
|The Practice| Matthew Billings
| 5 episodes
|-
| 2005
| Blue Heelers| Andrew Lapscott
| 3 episodes
|-
| 2005
| MDA| Dr. Andrew Morello
| 4 episodes
|-
| 2005
|We Can Be Heroes| Himself
| Episode 6
|-
| 2006
| Two Twisted| Duncan
| Episode: Love Crimes
|-
| 2007
| City Homicide| Ernie Calabrese
| 2 episodes
|-
| 2008
| Underbelly| Alphonse Gangitano
| 2 episodesNominated – Logie Award for Most Outstanding Actor
|-
| 2009
| Carla Cometti PD| Luciano Gandolfi
| Lead Role
|-
| 2010
| The Librarians| Adrian Green
| 3 episodes
|-
| 2010
| Australian Families of Crime| Narrator
| Episode: Killer Couple: David and Catherine McBirnie
|-
| 2010
| Cops LAC| Dominic Salter
| Episode: I'll See You
|-
| 2012
| Miss Fisher's Murder Mysteries| Hector Chambers
| Episode: Murder in Montparnasse
|-
| 2013
| Spartacus: War of the Damned| Herocleo
| 3 episodes
|-
| 2013
| Janet King| Jack Rizzoli
| 8 episodes
|-
| 2014
| Schapelle| Corby's Lawyer 
| TV movie
|-
| 2014
| Fat Tony & Co.| Alphonse Gangitano
| 1 episode
|-
| 2014
| It's A Date| Harry
| 1 episode
|-
|2017
| The Warriors (TV series) Comedy-drama 
|Mark Spinotti
|-
|2018
| Underbelly Files: Chopper
| Alphonse Gangitano
| 2 episodes
|-
| 2019
| Reef Break
| Mr. Pink
| 3 episodes
|}

Awards
AFI Awards
 1982 – Nominated for "Best Actor in a Lead Role" (for Moving Out)
 2001 – Won for "Best Actor in a Supporting Role" (for Lantana)
 2002 – Nominated for "Best Actor in a Lead Role" (for Walking on Water)
 2008 – Nominated for "Best Guest or Supporting Actor in a Television Drama"  (for Underbelly)

Logie Awards
 2009 – Nominated for "Most Outstanding Actor" (for Underbelly)

Newport Beach Film Festival, USA
 2011 – Jury Award for best actor for Face to Face.

References

External links

1966 births
Australian male film actors
Australian people of Italian descent
People of Calabrian descent
Australian male stage actors
Australian male television actors
Living people
Male actors from Melbourne
Victorian College of the Arts alumni
Best Supporting Actor AACTA Award winners